Helen Binkerd Young (1877–1959) was an early New York architect who graduated from Cornell University in 1900 and taught without being paid in the Cornell Home Economics Department from 1910–1921. Many of her lectures focused on architectural themes and organization. Her publications are still used in academic studies on housing design.

Biography
Helen Dorsey Binkerd was born on April 19, 1877 in Dayton, Ohio to Oscar William and Emma (née Brown) Binkerd. She attended the high school of Pratt Institute from 1892 to 1895 and went on to attain a Bachelors in Architecture from Cornell University in 1900, winning a medal for her drawing in that same year. On November 29, 1902, at Brooklyn, New York, she married George Young, Jr., (August 24, 1878 – January 15, 1956) a fellow architect. After their marriage, the couple lived for a brief time in New York and Pittsburgh before returning to Ithaca in the fall of 1909 as George had been offered a position at Cornell as Assistant Professor of Architecture. Unable to find work as an architect, or teaching architecture, Young took an unpaid position teaching in the Department of Home Economics at Cornell.

Young utilized her knowledge and training in architecture in her courses, stressing that of the three fundamental parts of domestic science, housing design was critical for properly organizing the work of a home. The second element, purposeful furnishings and fixtures, was also important for developing an environment conducive for both health and productivity. In addition to her college lectures, Young lectured at homemaker's conferences in various locations in the state. During this time, she also published several extension bulletins on similar themes, as well as participating in interviews for newspapers, such as the New York Times.

In 1918 she and George jointly designed "Hidden Home", their residence on Overlook Road, which was featured in the April 27, 1927 edition of The American Architect magazine. While few of her works have been identified, it is probable that her work was obscured by joint projects with her husband or other male colleagues. In 1920, Young was finally made a full professor, but she left the Department of Home Economics in 1921 to work as an architect and according to her obituary, she designed many of the homes in Cayuga Heights, New York. Her husband noted in 1926 that he had been contacted to design a home in New York and was uninterested, but that Young might be.

In 1946, George retired from Cornell and the couple moved to California Novato, California, where he died in 1956. Young died on May 22, 1959 in Berkeley, California and was buried in Ellenville, New York.

Legacy
Young's writings from her time at Cornell have been referenced in scholarly journals, like the Architectural Research Centers Consortium's Enquiry Magazine; the Winterthur Portfolio of the Henry Francis du Pont Winterthur Museum; and in a report evaluating "Closets in the Farm Home" prepared for Columbia University, among others.

Published works

Notes

References

Sources 

1877 births
1959 deaths
American women architects
19th-century American architects
20th-century American architects
Architects from Ohio
Cornell University College of Architecture, Art, and Planning alumni
Cornell University faculty
Artists from Dayton, Ohio
People from Novato, California
20th-century American women
American women academics
19th-century American women